"Go West, young man" is a phrase, the origin of which is often credited to the American author and newspaper editor Horace Greeley concerning America's expansion westward, related to the concept of Manifest destiny. No one has yet proven who first used this phrase in print.

The Oxford Dictionary of Quotations gives the full quotation as, "Go West, young man, and grow up with the country", from Hints toward Reforms (1850) by Horace Greeley, but the phrase does not occur in that book.

In 2010, Timothy Hughes of the "Rare & Early Newspapers" blog examined Greeley's writings and concluded that this text also does not appear in the  July 13, 1865 issue of the Tribune: "Here is the Tribune of that date and I've scoured through the issue yet never found the quote. The closest I could come is in 'The Homestead Law' article, page 4 column 4, where he mentioned: ' ... We earnestly urge upon all such to turn their faces Westward and colonize the public lands ... '. (See text image)." The actual editorial instead encourages American Civil War veterans to take advantage of the Homestead Act and colonize the public lands.

In 1849, Samuel Merritt was making a name for himself as a physician in Plymouth, Mass. Merritt, originally from Harpswell, Maine, completed a difficult operation on a friend of the aging statesman Daniel Webster. Webster lived in nearby Marshfield at the time. Impressed, Webster befriended the young doctor. As they spoke, Merritt admitted his fascination with the gold rush drawing people to California. Webster advised him, “Go out there, young man; go out there and behave yourself, and, free as you are from family cares, you will never regret it.” Samuel took the advice. https://www.newenglandhistoricalsociety.com/daniel-webster-tells-dr-samuel-merritt-go-west/

Greeley favored westward expansion. He saw the fertile farmland of the west as an ideal place for people willing to work hard for the opportunity to succeed. The phrase came to symbolize the idea that agriculture could solve many of the nation's problems of poverty and unemployment characteristic of the big cities of the East. It is one of the most commonly quoted sayings from the nineteenth century and may have had some influence on the course of American history.

Controversy

Josiah Bushnell Grinnell claimed in his autobiography that Horace Greeley first addressed the advice to him in 1833, before sending him off to Illinois to report on the Illinois Agricultural State Fair. Grinnell reports the full conversation as:

Grinnell College historian Joseph Frazier Wall claims that Greeley himself denied providing that advice and "[spent] the rest of this life vigorously protesting that he had never given this advice to Grinnell or anyone else ...". Wall wrote that an account of the true source of "Go West, young man" and Greeley's disavowal of being the author of the phrase is in Dictionary of Quotations by Bergen Evans and published by Delacourte Press in New York in 1968 (p. 745:2).

Wall wrote that Indiana State Library Newspaper Librarian John L. Selch, in a letter to William Deminoff on Dec. 12 1983, confirmed that John B. L. Soule was the source for this statement.

Author Ralph Keyes also suggests Soule as the source, offering an account in which the line originated from a bet between Soule and Indiana Congressman Richard W. Thompson over whether or not Soule could trick readers by forging a Greeley article.

Some claim it was first stated by John Babsone Lane Soule in an 1851 editorial in the Terre Haute Express, "Go west young man, and grow up with the country"; and that Greeley later used the quote in his own editorial in 1865. However, the phrase does not appear in the 1851 edition of the Terre Haute Express. An analysis of this phrase in the 2007 Skagit River Journal concludes: "the primary-source historical record contains not a shred of evidence that Soule had anything to do with the phrase."

References

1850s neologisms
American frontier
English phrases
History of United States expansionism
Horace Greeley
Internal migration